Joeri Stoffels (born 11 July 1973) is a Dutch water polo player. He competed in the men's tournament at the 1996 Summer Olympics.

References

External links
 

1973 births
Living people
Dutch male water polo players
Olympic water polo players of the Netherlands
Water polo players at the 1996 Summer Olympics
Sportspeople from Amstelveen
20th-century Dutch people